Thomas Stewart, (born 12 November 1986), is a Northern Irish footballer who is currently a free agent. He is known for his long range shooting and precise finishing.

Playing career

Wolverhampton Wanderers
As an apprentice Stewart was the youth team's top goalscorer and played in a FA Youth semi-final against Southampton in 2005, but never made the breakthrough to first team football.

Linfield
After returning from England he signed a full-time contract with the Blues on 11 September 2006. He scored on his debut v Limavady on the 30th, but subsequently was used mostly as a wide midfielder by David Jeffrey. He moved to Derry City following successful seasons at Linfield.

Derry City
Stewart signed for Stephen Kenny in June 2008 on a two and a half-year full-time contract. He made his debut in Sligo on 5 July. Stewart scored on his home debut the following week. He was the second opposition player to score at Tallaght Stadium in March 2009. He had a productive couple of seasons at the Brandywell winning the FAI League Cup and playing and scoring in the UEFA Europa League.

Shamrock Rovers
Despite agreeing terms with Carolina Railhawks in March 2010  the player returned home to sign for Shamrock Rovers. He made his debut against University College Dublin A.F.C. on 2 April. He scored Rovers' winner in the Europa League tie against Bnei Yehuda in July 2010 which set up the glamour tie against Italian giants Juventus. Stewart proved to be a big game player and in the last league game of the 2010 League of Ireland season he scored on the night Rovers secured their 16th domestic crown.

Partick Thistle
Stewart made his debut for Thistle in a home defeat against Falkirk F.C. His first goal came in a 3–2 defeat away to Dundee F.C. on 30 April 2011.

Return to Rovers
In July 2012 Stewart signed back for The Hoops scoring 11 times the following 2013 season.

Sacramento Republic
Stewart made the move to North America in 2014, signing with United Soccer League (3rd div.) club Sacramento Republic. In the 2014 season, he made 28 appearances and 17 starts in all competitions, scoring 13 goals and helping Sacramento to its first championship in its first-ever season.

In 2015 Stewart scored 8 goals in 24 appearances in all competitions, including 3 goals in 17 league appearances. That year he became the first Northern Irish player to score a hat-trick in the U.S. Open Cup, scoring three against Sonoma County Sol.

In 2016 Stewart scored 1 goal in 6 league starts for Sacramento with 2 assists.

Ottawa Fury
Stewart was transferred to the NASL's Ottawa Fury on 12 July 2016. Stewart scored 4 goals in 17 appearances, including 10 starts for Ottawa.

Dundalk
Stewart signed for Dundalk on 17 February 2017.

Larne
Stewart joined Larne in January 2018 and helped the club to the Championship title in 2018/19. On 1 September 2019, it was announced that Larne and Stewart had mutually agreed to terminate his contract.

International
Stewart played for the Northern Ireland national under-19 football team in the 2005 UEFA European Under-19 Football Championship finals that were hosted in Northern Ireland. He scored their only goal against Germany. Voted top 10 future players following the tournament. Stewart captained his national U21 team against Scotland in a 1–0 victory in which he scored in.

Honours
Linfield
Irish Premier League (2): 2006–07, 2007–08
Irish Cup (2): 2006–07, 2007–08

Derry City
League of Ireland Cup (1): 2008

Shamrock Rovers
League of Ireland (1): 2010
Setanta Sports Cup (1): 2013

Sacramento Republic
USL Cup (1): 2014

References

External links

1986 births
Living people
People from Craigavon, County Armagh
Association football forwards
Association footballers from Northern Ireland
Northern Ireland under-21 international footballers
NIFL Premiership players
League of Ireland players
Scottish Football League players
USL Championship players
North American Soccer League players
Wolverhampton Wanderers F.C. players
Linfield F.C. players
Derry City F.C. players
Shamrock Rovers F.C. players
Partick Thistle F.C. players
Portadown F.C. players
Sacramento Republic FC players
Ottawa Fury FC players
Dundalk F.C. players
Expatriate association footballers from Northern Ireland
Expatriates from Northern Ireland in the Republic of Ireland
Expatriate association footballers in the Republic of Ireland
Expatriate soccer players in the United States
Expatriate soccer players in Canada